The Rio Grande Valley Killer Bees were a Tier II Junior A ice hockey team playing in the North American Hockey League.  The team was based in the Rio Grande Valley in Hidalgo, Texas, just south of McAllen, and played their home games at State Farm Arena.

History
The original team was a member of the Central Hockey League, a professional minor league, from 2003 to 2012. On June 20, 2012, multiple sources confirmed that the Killer Bees would not play in the 2012–13 season and ceased operations due to increased travel costs after the folding of the other Texas CHL teams in Austin, Corpus Christi and Laredo.

After a season without a team, the Wenatchee Wild of the North American Hockey League (NAHL), a Tier II Junior A hockey league, relocated to Hidalgo, Texas and became the second incarnation of the Rio Grande Valley Killer Bees. Joe Coombs would be hired as the first head coach of the NAHL Killer Bees.

On June 1, 2015, NAHL insiders began reporting the Killer Bees franchise was about to relocate to the Philadelphia suburb of Aston, Pennsylvania and the Killer Bees would subsequently announce that the team was ceasing to operate for the 2015–16 season unless the team president, Gilbert Saenz, could find a local alternative to save the team. However, on June 9, the NAHL announced that the franchise was relocating to become the Aston Rebels.

In 2018, another junior level Killer Bees team was announced as part of the USA Central Hockey League starting in October 2018, but the entire league folded after six weeks of operation.

Season-by-season records

Notes

External links

Rio Grande Valley Killer Bees
NAHL website

Ice hockey teams in Texas
North American Hockey League teams
Sports in the Rio Grande Valley
Hidalgo County, Texas
Ice hockey clubs established in 2013
Ice hockey clubs disestablished in 2015
2013 establishments in Texas
2015 disestablishments in Texas